The Don River Bridge is a road bridge that carries the Bruce Highway across the Don River, located  near  Bowen, Queensland, Australia.

See also

 Don River Bridge, Rannes

Road bridges in Queensland
Bowen, Queensland
Concrete bridges in Australia